Olga Strantzali (born January 12, 1996) is a female professional volleyball player from Greece, who is a member of the Greek national team. Currently she competes as an οutside hitter for PAOK.

Personal
Strantzali has relationship with Vassilis Kavvadas.

References

External links
 profile at greekvolley.gr 

Greek women's volleyball players
1996 births
Living people
Mediterranean Games silver medalists for Greece
Mediterranean Games medalists in volleyball
Competitors at the 2018 Mediterranean Games
People from Skydra
Sportspeople from Central Macedonia